Limaria tuberculata is a species of bivalves belonging to the family Limidae.

The species has almost cosmopolitan distribution.

References

Limidae
Bivalves described in 1792